is the name of many temples in Japan.
The statue of jizō can be shown publicly once a year on the day of setsubun (February 3) with bean scattering and parade of Shichifukujin. The temple locates facing  and near . 
Ichimura Takenojō, a Japanese actor and act promoter, visited the temple in April, 1679, during the Edo period of Japanese history. The temple was relocated from Honjo (present day Sumida, Tokyo) during the Edo period.
There is a modern temple of the same name in Tokyo, currently headed by Eichi Osawa.